Tom Fisher may refer to:

Tom Fisher (1960s pitcher) (born 1942), former Major League Baseball pitcher
Tom Fisher (1900s pitcher) (1880–1972), Major League Baseball pitcher
Tom Fisher (The Young and the Restless), a fictional character from the American soap opera The Young and the Restless
Tom Fisher (footballer) (born 1992), English footballer
Tom Fisher (actor) (born 1968), English actor
Tom Fisher (rugby union) (1891–1968), New Zealand rugby union player
Tom Fisher (mathematician), Cambridge University mathematician and winner of the 2014 Selfridge Prize

See also 
Thomas Fisher (disambiguation)